The 2020–21 FA Cup qualifying rounds opened the 140th season of The Football Association Challenge Cup (FA Cup), the world's oldest association football single knockout competition, organised by The Football Association, the governing body for the sport in England (though the competition also features teams from Wales). The 32 winning teams from the Fourth qualifying round progressed to the First Round Proper.

The FA made 737 places available in the FA Cup for the 2020–21 season, an increase in two on the previous season, due to the need to produce an extra qualifier in the second qualifying round, following a shortfall in teams at step 2 of the National League System. Following the liquidation of Macclesfield Town, 736 teams ultimately entered the competition. The 92 teams from the EFL and Premier League received direct entry to the competition proper. The remaining 644 teams, from the National League System (levels 5–10 of the English football league system), entered into the qualifying competition consisting of six rounds of preliminary (2) and qualifying (4) knockout matches.

With 889 eligible entrants, more than the number of places available, teams from level 10 of the English football league system were accepted up to the point at which the 737 places were full, based on a random draw. This reflected the cancellation of level 10 leagues in 2019–20 due to the COVID-19 pandemic, and thus the absence of league placings on which to base qualification, as had been used in previous seasons. The pandemic also led to the removal of replays from the qualifying competition, in order to fit with a delayed start following the extended 2019–20 football season, and a reduction in the prize fund, with figures returning to those last used in the 2017–18 season.

Calendar
Planned dates for the early qualifying rounds were released to clubs in the National League System in late July, and confirmed by the FA on 3 August 2020. With replays removed from qualifying, several rounds were scheduled for Tuesdays rather than the usual Saturday.

Extra preliminary round
Extra preliminary round fixtures were played on 31 August – 3 September 2020. The draw was made on 18 August 2020. A total of 368 teams, from Level 8, Level 9 and Level 10 of English football, entered at this stage of the competition, 20 of which were making their first appearance in the competition. This round included 74 teams from Level 10, the lowest-ranked teams in the competition.

Preliminary round
This draw was also made on 18 August 2020, and saw another 136 clubs joining the 184 winners from the previous round. Ties were played between Friday, 11 September and Monday, 14 September 2020. This round included 26 teams from Level 10, the lowest-ranked teams left in the competition.

First qualifying round
The draw for the first qualifying round was made on 14 September 2020, and saw another 74 clubs from Level 7 joining the 160 winners from the Preliminary round. Ties were played between Monday, 21 September and Wednesday, 23 September 2020. This round included 6 teams from Level 10, the lowest-ranked teams left in the competition.

Second qualifying round
The draw for the Second qualifying round was made on 25 September 2020, and saw 43 clubs from Level 6 joining the 117 winners from the First qualifying round. Ties were played between Saturday, 3 October and Monday, 5 October 2020. This round included two teams from Level 10, Saltash United and Risborough Rangers, the lowest-ranked teams left in the competition.

Third qualifying round
The draw for the Third qualifying round was made on 5 October 2020, and consists solely of the 80 winners from the Second qualifying round. Ties were played on Tuesday, 13 October and Wednesday, 14 October 2020. This round included five teams from Level 9, these being Longridge Town, Skelmersdale United, Chatham Town, Sheppey United, and Christchurch, the lowest-ranked teams left in the competition.

Fourth qualifying round
The draw for the Fourth qualifying round was made on 15 October 2020, and saw 23 clubs from Level 5 joining the 40 winners from the Third qualifying round. Ties were played on the weekend of Saturday, 24 October 2020. This round included one team from Level 9, Skelmersdale United, the lowest-ranked team left in the competition. Due to the liquidation of Macclesfield Town, there was an odd number of teams competing in this round. As a result, Chorley were drawn to receive a bye to the First Round Proper.

Broadcasting
The qualifying rounds were not covered by the FA Cup's broadcasting contracts held by BBC Sport and BT Sport, although one game per round was broadcast by the BBC on its media platforms. In addition, Hashtag United streamed their second qualifying round match live on Twitch.

Notes

References

External links
 The FA Cup

qualifying rounds
FA Cup qualifying rounds